West Chester station may refer to:

 West Chester station (West Chester Railroad), a West Chester Railroad train station in West Chester, Pennsylvania, USA
 West Chester Transportation Center, a bus terminal and parking garage in West Chester, Pennsylvania, USA
 Westchester Station, a community in Nova Scotia, Canada
 West Chester University station, a former railroad station in West Chester, Pennsylvania, USA

See also
West Chester (disambiguation)
Westchester (disambiguation)